OOO, Ooo, or ooo may refer to:

Frequently used abbreviations 

 OoO, an abbreviation for Out of Office, a phrase often used in professional contexts to indicate that someone is unavailable for work (usually because they are on vacation)
 ООО, a type of private limited company in Russia

Arts, entertainment, and media
 Kamen Rider OOO, a 2010–11 tokusatsu series
 Kamen Rider OOO (character), a fictional character from the tokusatsu series of the same name
 The Land of Ooo, the setting of Adventure Time
OOO, the production code for the 1972 Doctor Who serial The Time Monster
 "Ooo", a song by !!! from their 2015 album As If
 "Ooo", a track from the soundtrack of the 2015 video game Undertale by Toby Fox
 O.O.O (Over&Over&Over), theme song of Girls Planet 999 and Kep1er version, recorded in First Impact

Computing and networking
 .OOO, an Internet top-level domain
 OpenOffice.org, a discontinued office application suite
 Out-of-order execution, a paradigm in microprocessors

Other uses
 OOO gauge, an old British model railway scale
 Order of operations, in evaluating mathematical expressions
 Object-oriented ontology, a metaphysical school of thought
 O-O-O, long (or queenside), castling in chess

See also 
Triple-O (disambiguation)
 000 (disambiguation) (three zeros) 
 O00, the Alturas Municipal Airport
 One on One (disambiguation)
 Out of Order (disambiguation)
 Three Rings Design, an online game developer
 OO (disambiguation)